Paintsville is a home rule-class city along Paint Creek in Johnson County, Kentucky, in the United States. It is the seat of its county. The population was 3,459 during the 2010 U.S. Census.

History
A Paint Lick Station was referred to in military dispatches as early as 1780. The site was named for Indian art painted on the debarked trees near a local salt lick when the first white settlers arrived and was originally part of a  tract belonging to George Lewis. The trading post was purchased by the Carolinian Rev.Henery Dixon in 1812 and laid out as the town of Paint Lick Station in 1826. The town was formally established under that name in 1834, although the post office was probably named Paint Creek. It was incorporated as a city under its present name of Paintsville in 1843, the same year it became the seat of Johnson County.

The Civil War found Johnson County Fiscal Court passing an ordinance barring both Union and Confederate flags from being flown in its jurisdiction. This was quickly repealed when then-Col. James A. Garfield marched his brigade into the city.

During the early twentieth century, Paintsville began to transform into a modern American city. In 1902, the city's first bank  First National  opened for business. In 1906, the city received telephone service and, two years later, all of its streets were paved. In 1912, Paintsville received electricity and natural gas services. In 1926, Paintsville residents received public water and the city's fire department was established. Library services were originally provided through the Pack Horse Library Project.

Since the 1990s, Paintsville has seen a steady loss of population (4,345 in 1990 to 3,459 in 2010), in part due to a downturn in the economy, and the loss of coal jobs. Despite this, there have been some business developments in the past few years, as well as growing tourist interest. Paintsville has been in the process of revitalizing the downtown area to rejuvenate its original business district. On June 9, 2009, Paintsville became a "wet" city for the first time since March 14, 1945, permitting stores located within the city limits to sell alcoholic beverages.

Geography

Paintsville is located at  (37.811324, −82.806780) in the bottomland at the confluence of Paint Creek and the Levisa Fork of the Big Sandy River amid the foothills of the Appalachian Mountains in the Cumberland Plateau.

Cityscape

Beginning in 1976, Paintsville's main shopping district has gradually moved from Main Street to Mayo Plaza, which is northwest of downtown. Stores such as Wal-Mart and Lowe's opened in the plaza during the early 1990s. This proved to be too much competition for the small family-owned businesses in downtown causing them to close. Today, downtown mostly serves as Paintsville's financial district. In May 2009 Paintsville received a grant to redevelop Main Street in hopes of making it one of the city's popular shopping districts again. In recent years, Mayo Plaza has rapidly expanded. In the early 2000s, a new Wal-Mart Supercenter, a new Lowe's, and multiple restaurants opened.

Climate
Paintsville has a humid subtropical climate (Köppen Cfa). Summers are hot and humid with frequent severe storms. July is the warmest month, with an average high 86 °F (30 °C) and an average low of 66 °F (19 °C).  Winters are cold with occasional mild periods. January is the coldest month with an average high of 44 °F (7 °C) and an average low of 24 °F (−4 °C). The highest recorded temperature was 105 °F (41 °C) in 1988 and the lowest recorded temperature was −26 °F (−32 °C) in 1994. May has the highest average rainfall (4.54 inches) and October has the lowest average rainfall (2.97 inches).

Demographics

As of the census of 2010, there were 3,459 people, 1,604 households, and 856 families residing in the city. The population density was 1300.1 people per square mile. There were 1,844 housing units at an average density of 693.2 per square mile. The racial makeup of the city was 99.3% White, 0.3% African American, 0.8% Native American, 0.4% Asian, 0.1% Pacific Islander, and 0.2% from other races. Hispanic or Latino people of any race were 0.4% of the population.

In the city, the population was spread out, with 20.5% under 19, 6.1% from 20 to 24, 11.0% from 25 to 34, 11.9% from 35 to 44, 15.1% from 45 to 54, 14.4% from 55 to 64, and 21.1% who were 65 or older. The median age is 41.9 years. There were 1,574 males and 1,885 females.

The median income for a household in the city was $25,259, and the median income for a family was $30,575. Males had a median income of $30,478 versus $25,640 for females. The per capita income for the city was $15,876. About 21.0% of families and 29.4% of the population were below the poverty line, including 39.9% of those under age 18 and 22.0% of those age 65 or over.

Crime
In 2009, the following crime rate (per 100,000 population) was reported to the Federal Bureau of Investigation by the city police department:

Five people died in a 2018 shooting spree.

Government
Paintsville has a mayor–council form of government. Paintsville's current mayor/city executive is Bill Mike Runyon, who was appointed in 2016.

Former mayors:

 Richard C. Thomas (1920–1922)
 Dr. J.C. Sparks (1924)
 James N. Meek (1924–1925)
 Dr. E.E. Archer (1926–1933)
 F.S. Vanhoose (1934–1939)
 J.B. Wells Jr. (1940–1945)
 Escom Chandler (1946–1949)
 J.B. Wells, Jr. (1949–1955)
 Ralph B. "Tiny" Preston (1955–1965)
 J.B. Wells, Jr. (1966–1969)
 John E. Chandler (1969–1975)
 Jim T. Newman (1975)
 Allen S. Perry (1975)
 James S. Trimble (1975–1985)
 Robert Wiley (1986–1988)
 John David Preston (1988–1993)
 Robin T. Cooper (1994–2002)
 Douglas W. Pugh (2003–2006)
 Bob Porter (2007–2016)
 Bill Mike Runyon (2016–present)

The representative body of the city of Paintsville is the city council. The council members include Sara Blair, Tim Hall, Tommy Trimble, Jim Meek, David Trimble, and Shawn Thompson.

Departments
The city mayor oversees the following departments:

Community Planning and Zoning Services
Finance
Human Resources
Police
Public Works
Parks and Recreation
Tourism
Fire/EMS

Education

The Paintsville Independent School District includes Paintsville High School (7th–12th grades) and Paintsville Elementary School. Paintsville Independent has consistently had college attendance rates between 95% to 100% since 2008. In 2012, the district had a composite ACT score of 22.7. It was the 4th highest composite ACT score out of the 169 school districts in the state of Kentucky.
 
Johnson County Schools also operates three schools within the city of Paintsville: Johnson Central High School, Johnson County Middle School (Kentucky), and Central Elementary School. Johnson County is also well known for its academics. Johnson Central High School has won five international Future Problem Solving titles while the middle school has won 10 Governor's Cup state titles along with three international FPS titles.
 
Our Lady of the Mountains School is a private institution operated by the Roman Catholic Bishop of the Diocese of Lexington.
 
Big Sandy Community and Technical College operates a campus in Paintsville that offers two-year degrees in various fields of study.

Paintsville has a lending library, the Johnson County Public Library.

Culture

Festivals 
The Kentucky Apple Festival has been held in Paintsville annually since 1962. Events include live music, carnival rides, a pageant, various competitions, a parade, and a car show. The festival occurs annually on the first full weekend in October.

The Awaken Conference, an annual Christian concert event attracting thousands of people to the area, is held each July in the city.

Paintsville also holds a Spring Fling on Main Street in May.

Museums and historical sites 

The U.S. 23 County Music Highway Museum gives information on the country music entertainers who grew up near U.S. 23 in Eastern Kentucky. Country music entertainers profiled in the museum include Loretta Lynn, Crystal Gayle, and Hylo Brown.

The historic Mayo Mansion was built for John C. C. Mayo between 1905 and 1912. It now serves as Our Lady of the Mountains School.

The Mayo Memorial United Methodist Church was designed by one hundred Italian masons hired by John C. C. Mayo. It has several stained glass windows and has a pipe organ donated by Andrew Carnegie. The first church service was in the fall of 1909.

Recreation 

The Paintsville Country Club includes an 18-hole golf course established on September 27, 1929, making it one of the oldest golf courses in Eastern Kentucky. The country club was built in 1930 by the WPA and is on the National Register of Historic Places.

The Paintsville Recreation Center contains a volleyball court, a basketball court, a walking track, and a playground. There is also a small community garden on site.

Media 

The Paintsville Herald is a semi-weekly newspaper printed on Wednesday and Friday with a circulation of about 5,200 copies. The newspaper serves Paintsville and the surrounding area.

Healthcare
Paintsville ARH Hospital- Formally known as Paul B. hall Regional Medical Center is a full-service hospital providing healthcare to the region. It has a full-service emergency room with a pediatric trauma room, a hyperbaric oxygen chamber, a special birthing room, and full service surgical services, including a daVinci Si robotic system providing state-of-the-art laparoscopic surgery for the greater Paintsville region.

Transportation

Roads 
U.S. Route 23 serves as the bypass for Paintsville. The four-lane divided highway links Paintsville to Interstate 64 to the north and U.S. Route 119 and Kentucky Route 80 to the south. U.S. Route 460 links Paintsville to the Bert T. Combs Mountain Parkway in Salyersville. Kentucky Route 40 forms both Euclid Avenue and Third Street in Paintsville. It links the city to Inez and also serves as an alternative route to Salyersville. Kentucky Route 321, locally known as South Mayo Trail, serves as the city's main business route and passes through Mayo Plaza.

Air 
Located southeast of Paintsville in neighboring Martin County is Big Sandy Regional Airport. The publicly owned, private-use airport is used for general aviation. Its main runway is 5,000 ft (1,524 m) long.

Popular culture
 The majority of the 1983 film Kentucky Woman was filmed in Paintsville.
 Paintsville was one of the three filming locations for the 2010 drama film, Passenger Pigeons.

Notable people
 Willie Blair, pitcher in Major League Baseball 1990–2001
 Tyler Childers, country, bluegrass, and rock musician 
 Jim Ford, singer-songwriter; born in Paintsville
 Jim Fyffe, sportscaster and radio talk-show host
 Crystal Gayle, country music singer and recording artist; born in Paintsville in 1951 (Older sister Loretta Lynn was born in nearby Butcher Hollow/Van Lear in 1932)
 Andrew Jackson Kirk, U.S. Representative from Kentucky
 Johnnie LeMaster, Major League Baseball player (San Francisco Giants, Cleveland Indians, Pittsburgh Pirates); resides in Paintsville
 John C. C. Mayo, entrepreneur
 Wendell H. Meade, Republican member of U.S. House of Representatives 1947–49; born in Paintsville
 John Pelphrey, Kentucky "Mr. Basketball" of 1987, one of four University of Kentucky basketball players dubbed "The Unforgettables"; former Arkansas head coach 
 Venus Ramey, Miss America 1944; grew up in Paintsville
 Ovie Scurlock, born in Paintsville on November 11, 1918, former jockey in horse racing
 Benjamin F. Stapleton, Mayor of Denver, Colorado 1923–1931 and 1935–1947, born in Paintsville
 Chris Stapleton, country, bluegrass, rock musician signed to Universal Music Group Nashville; attended Johnson Central High School in Paintsville
 Richard Scott Thomas, born in Paintsville on December 3, 1925, dancer, educator, co-founder of New York School of Ballet; father of Richard Earl Thomas, actor best known for role as John-Boy Walton in CBS drama The Waltons

See also
 Johnson County, Kentucky
 Paul B. Hall Regional Medical Center
 Citizens National Bank
 Paintsville High School
 Johnson Central High School
 U.S. 23 Country Music Highway Museum
 Francis M. Stafford House

References

External links

 City of Paintsville
 Weather Forecast for Paintsville
 Paintsville/Johnson County Chamber of Commerce
 Paintsville Tourism
 Paintsville Independent Schools
 Johnson County Public Schools
 The Paintsville Herald
 Kentucky Apple Festival
 Johnson County Public Library
 Paintsville Golf Course

Cities in Johnson County, Kentucky
Cities in Kentucky
County seats in Kentucky
Populated places established in 1834
1834 establishments in Kentucky